Keith Drummond Downes (12 June 1917 – 18 February 1990) was a British first-class cricketer, rugby union player and soldier.

Downes was born at Liverpool in June 1917. He later studied at Christ's College at the University of Cambridge, matriculating in 1936. While studying at Cambridge, he played first-class cricket for Cambridge University in 1939, making eight appearances as a wicket-keeper. He scored 102 runs in his eight matches, at an average of 9.27 and a high score of 27. Behind the stumps he took 6 catches and made a single stumping. Downes played 15 matches for Leicester in total.

The beginning of the Second World War in September 1939 saw Downes commissioned into the King's Regiment (Liverpool) as a second lieutenant in September 1940. He was transferred to the Royal Artillery in June 1942 and by 1945, he was a war substantive lieutenant with the Royal Welch Fusiliers. Downes married Barbara Benneit Wilton at Newcastle in July 1942 and died at Sheffield in February 1990.

References

External links

1917 births
1990 deaths
People from Liverpool
Alumni of Christ's College, Cambridge
English cricketers
Cambridge University cricketers
British Army personnel of World War II
King's Regiment (Liverpool) officers
Royal Artillery officers
Royal Welch Fusiliers officers
Leicester Tigers players